Eastern Orthodoxy in Austria refers to communities, institutions and organizations of the Eastern Orthodox Christianity on the territory of modern Austria. There are several Eastern Orthodox jurisdictions in Austria. As of 2019, it is estimated that there are some 400,000 to 450,000 Eastern Orthodox believers in Austria.
 Most of them are ethnic Serbs and Romanians.

History 

By the end of the Middle Ages, migration of Eastern Orthodox Christians towards Austrian lands was intensified due to expansion of the Ottoman Empire in various regions of Southeastern Europe. Exiled members of Eastern Orthodox royal and noble families were welcomed by Habsburg rulers, who granted them new possessions. In 1479, emperor Friedrich III granted castle Weitensfeld in Carinthia to exiled members of Branković dynasty of Serbia. Often accompanied by their priests, exiled noble families created first Eastern Orthodox cells in Austrian lands.

During the period of Ottoman–Habsburg wars (16th-18th centuries), Habsburg policy towards Eastern Orthodox Christians was often marked by special interests, related to complex religious situation in various regions of the expanding Habsburg monarchy. Political aspirations of Habsburg rulers were directed towards various lands in Southeastern Europe, held by the declining Ottoman Empire. Since those regions were inhabited by Eastern Orthodox population, Habsburg court was inclined to adopt policy of religious tolerance.

Emperor Leopold I issued several charters (1690, 1691, 1695) to Eastern Orthodox Serbs, who sided with Habsburgs during the Vienna War (1683-1699), granting them religious freedom in the Monarchy. Serbian Orthodox patriarch Arsenije III visited Austrian capital (Vienna) on several occasions, and died there in 1706.

Serbian Orthodox metropolitan Isaija Đaković, who visited Austrian capital on several occasions since 1690, also died in Vienna, in 1708. During the 18th century, Eastern Orthodox communities in major Austrian cities were consisted mainly of ethnic Greeks, Serbs and Romanians. Most prominent among them were merchants and officers, who were the main donors of religious institutions, at first under the spiritual jurisdiction of the Metropolitanate of Karlovci. Later development led to the creation of autonomous and particular jurisdictions, thus establishing separate parishes for different ethnic communities. That process was finalized after the First World War (1914-1918).

Eastern Orthodox Churches in Austria 

There are several Eastern Orthodox jurisdictions on the territory of modern Austria:

 Bulgarian Orthodox Church in Austria: Parish of St. Ivan Rilski, Vienna.
 Greek Orthodox Metropolis of Austria: 12 parishes, of which three are in Vienna.
 Greek Orthodox Patriarchate of Antioch: Two parishes, in Vienna and Insbruck.
 Romanian Orthodox Church in Austria: Five parishes, of which one is in Vienna.
 Russian Orthodox Eparchy of Vienna and Austria: Parish of St. Nicholas, Vienna.
 Serbian Orthodox Eparchy of Austria and Switzerland: Four Parishes, of which two are in Vienna, including Parish of St. Sava.

See also
 Metropolitanate of Karlovci
 Declaratory Rescript of the Illyrian Nation

References

Literature